Kraalhoek is a town in Bojanala District Municipality in the North West province of South Africa.

References

Populated places in the Moses Kotane Local Municipality